Hustler is an unincorporated community in Amite County, Mississippi, United States.

Hustler had a population of 18 in 1900.  The post office closed in 1905.

References

Unincorporated communities in Amite County, Mississippi
Unincorporated communities in Mississippi